Ryomgård is a Danish country town with a population of 2,498 (1 January 2022) located 29 kilometers north east of to the country’s second largest city Aarhus. As such Ryomgård is in part a pendler town to Aarhus.

Ryomgård lies in the middle of the peninsula, Djursland, protruding into the Kattegat Sea from another peninsula, Jutland, that extends up from northern Germany. It’s a 216 kilometer drive to the German border. From Ryomgård it’s a two and a half hour drive by car and ferry to the Danish capital Copenhagen on the island of Zealand.

Ryomgård is located in Syddjurs Municipality which covers the southern half of the Djursland-peninsula. Ryomgård lies 14 kilometers from the sea.

History 
Before roads were common in Denmark prior to 1700 the place where Ryomgård lies was one of the few passageways over the swamp and lake divide that separated the northern part of  Djursland from the southern part. There was a toll station for passage, close to the manor house, Gammel Ryomgård, that dates back to the 17th century.

Ryomgård came to life as a town in the late 1870s when a railway was established from Randers on mainland Jutland across the Djursland peninsula to the fishing- and seaport Grenå on the east coast of Djursland.

Ryomgård lay midway between Randers and Grenå by the railway. The development of Ryomgård was further consolidated when another rail line was built between Ryomgård and Århus, Denmark's second largest city 30 kilometers south east of Ryomgård. This was also in the 1870s.
  
Around 1900 Ryomgård was described as follows: "Ryom railway town with cooperative dairy, brickworks, grocery store, mill, guesthouse, railway, telegraph and poststation."

In 1911 another railway line from Ryomgård to Gjerrild in the north of Djursland was added, making Ryomgård a railway hub on Djursland. 
  
Establishing a lower secondary school, Ryomgård Realskole, near the railway in 1913 contributed further to the growth of the town.

Geography and Climate 
The climate in the region is temperate coastal, with an average summer temperature in July of 20 degrees Celsius in the day, and 12 degrees at night, and an average winter temperature in January with 5 degrees in the day and 1 degree at night (1961 – 1990)  The average precipitation is 722 millimeters per year, making Ryomgård as well as the rest of Denmark well suited for farming. Barley, wheat, canola, and in recent years corn, are common crops in the farmland surrounding Ryomgård.

The name "Ryomgård" comes from the Danish word  Ryom, which is one of several old words for clearing in a wood. Also today the town is close to a central forested area on Djursland, the Fjeld and Løvenholm woods.

Ryomgårds main street, Vestergade, is 17 meters above sea level. The town was founded above the north bank of a former sound that in the stone ages cut of north Djursland from the mainland making the northern part of Djursland an island. Newer parts of the town have been built on south facing hills up from to the former sound reaching an elevation above sea level of about 40 meters. At the top of the hills, where the land gets more flat, evened out by of ice sheets during the last ice age, 12.000 years ago, the most recent new housing is seen.

Demographics

The geographical region, Djursland, where Ryomgård is situated, has an average population density of 42 inhabitants per square km, as compared to 407 for neighboring England and 230 for neighboring Germany. Although this is much more than in the other Scandinavian countries Norway, Sweden and Finland with extensive mountain ranges and a colder climate, it rarely gets crowded in the Djursland area, including along the 260 kilometer coastline of Djursland, where public access  to all of the coastline is secured according to Danish law.

This contributes to a potential for coastal tourism in the region. There is a summer influx of tourists, mainly from the Scandinavian countries plus Germany and Holland. Often based on staying in summer rentals along the coast. Even though this is part of the overall economy of the Djursland area, Ryomgård is not significantly based on tourism, due to the relative inland location away from the coast.

Many Danes have a working knowledge of English and to some extent German - the two main foreign languages taught in Danish schools.

Traditionally Danes are Protestants with about 75 percent being members of the Protestant church, Folkekirken. In the Danish Wikipedia article about “Danskere” The Danes, it is stated that about 40 percent of Danes are non-believers, according to a survey. It is characteristic that only a minority of Danish Protestants are regular church goers.

Institutions 
There are a number of indoor and outdoor public sports facilities in Ryomgård.

Public institutions in Ryomgård cover aspects such as elderly care, protected housing, kindergartens, maintenance of public infrastructure and more.

By the railway station in Ryomgård Djurslands Railway Museum is located describing Danish and local railway history over the last 150 years.

Transport
The Grenaa railway line between Aarhus and Grenaa passes through Ryomgård. After an electrification and renovation from 2016 to 2019, the railway reopened in 2019 with train connections from Ryomgård railway station to Aarhus and Grenaa every 30 minutes as opposed to 60 minutes before the renovation. This is expected to add to the influx of pendlers to Aarhus choosing to live in Ryomgård, as value for money when buying a house in Ryomgård might be better than closer to Aarhus.

By car it takes about 25 minutes to reach the northern outskirts of Aarhus, driving on the Djursland Motorway two thirds of the way.
  
Aarhus Airport is 14 kilometers from Ryomgård, with several national flights daily to Copenhagen, as well as a number of international flights, including a Ryan Air connection to Stansted in England.

From the bus station in Ryomgård there are connections to neighboring towns including Randers, Hornslet, Rønde, Ebeltoft, Grenaa and Bønnerup as well as Aarhus.

Education
There is a public and a private primary school in Ryomgård. The private school, Ryomgård Realskole, on the main street, was founded in 1913 and has got about 270 pupils covering 1 to 10th grade. The public School, Marienhofskolen, located at the top of one of the hills down to the main street, was founded in 1971, and has got 400 pupils from 1. to 9th grade.
 
Ryomgård has also got a Produktionsskole, a practically oriented school for young people who are on their way to finding an education or job.
 
The three towns, Rønde, 12 kilometers from Ryomgård, Randers, 34 kilometers from Ryomgård, and Grenaa 28 kilometers from Ryomgård, have high schools and vocational educations used by young people in Ryomgård, who can go to and from these towns by bus.

Young people in Ryomgård also go by bus or train to Aarhus to attend high school and other educations, as well University.

Housing

The sixties and the seventies saw economic growth in Denmark, and a lot of single family homes with a characteristic one story design were built. This is also the case in Ryomgård, where the hills up from the main street became built up. The public school Marienhofskolen was also built in this period at the top of one of the hills. 
  

Today a typical 130 square meter house with a 1500 square meter garden from the sixties or seventies that is well kept is priced in the range of 1.2 – 2 million kroner. Such houses are within the price range of working or middle-class families were both adults work. Both adults working full-time in a family is the norm in Denmark. Newly built houses typically cost between  2 – 3 million kroner in Ryomgård, according to a local real estate agent.

Along the main street in Ryomgård, houses built between the twenties and fifties can be seen. Denmark is generally wealthy and also older houses in Ryomgård are most often kept modern and up to date. This has also got to do with the proximity to Århus making it attractive to work in the city and live in a small town not too far from the city, such as Ryomgård.

Surroundings
Ryomgårds neighboring town 6 kilometers to the east, Pindstrup, has been a centre for peat moss production employing many people in the first half of the 19th century at Pindstrup Mosebrug. Now only the Pindstrup Mosebrug head quarteres are located in Pindstrup, with production facilities based on peat bogs located elsewhere in and outside Denmark.  At the same Pindstrup-location a spinoff, Novopan, is a European manufacturer of particleboard for house building and furniture production based on 80 percent recycled wood.

8 kilometers east of Ryomgård lies Kolind, a similar seized town that has given name to the Sound of Kolind – now a drained lake, that is rich farmland below sea level. The former lake stretches out to the Kattegat sea by the seaport, Grenå 30 kilometers from Ryomgård to the east.  The lowland meadows south of Ryomgård become The Sound of Kolind to the east by Kolind.

Ryomgård is 3 kilometers from Fjeld Skov, a forest connected to Løvenholm Skov. This forested area is one af the larger woods in Denmark. Common tree types in this climatic region are Norwegian spruce, Scotch pine, larch, beach oak, and birch.

The forest lake, Valum Sø, just east of Ryomgård has a recreational footpath round it often used by joggers from Ryomgård.

Being located on a peninsula there are 20 sandy beaches and several marinas within a 15 - 30 kilometers driving distance from Ryomgård.

Denmarks largest river, Gudenå, has its outlet into the 30 kilometer long Randers Fjord, a 28 kilometer drive north of Ryomgård, Here recreational fishing for species such as sea trout, salmon, whitefish, flounders and herring is common.

Fishing and snorkeling is also good on the 50 kilometer east coast of the peninsula Djursland, north and south of Grenå.

On the net
Ryomgård has got a comprehensive homepage in Danish at www.ryomgård.dk,  describing aspects of town life such as shops, businesses, trades and ongoing town improvements, property listed for sale by real estate agents, and more, including videos from Ryomgård. Ryomgård is also represented on Facebook in Danish at, “8550 Ryomgård” with local people to people news and announcements and comments, also in Danish.

Notable people 
 Martin Jørgensen (born 1975 in Ryomgård) a former professional footballer with 530 club caps and 102 for Denmark
 Mads Jørgensen (born 1979 in Ryomgård) a Danish former professional footballer over 200 club caps and 1 for Denmark
 Dennis Høegh (born 1989 in Ryomgård) a Danish professional footballer almost 200 club caps

Points of interest
  Walks and hiking – north, east and south of Ryomgård along the coastline of Djursland with a varied and accessible 260 km coastline 
 Fishing and diving – primarily on the east coast of Djursland 30 –  40 km from Ryomgård and in Randers Fjord
 Kalø Castle - ruined castle on a peninsula with bights, inlets on southern Djursland 16 km from Ryomgård 
 Nappedam Marina - marine environment 16 kilometers south of Ryomgård.
 Mushroom picking in the forests and non-farmed areas of Djursland from August, through autumn until first frost. Such as in Fjeld Skov and around Vallum sø next to Ryomgård
 Mols Bjerge National Park – Hilly landscape – walks, sightseeing drives, and  horseback riding, on southern Djursland 20 km south of Ryomgård
 Grenaa Beach - 5 km of sandy beach starting at Grenaa Marina. Nominated as one of 2 best Danish beaches in 2006 
 Cliffs of Sangstrup and Karlby - Fossil rich coastal lime cliffs 35 km north east of Ryomgård
Kalø Vintage Car Rally (Tirsdagstræf) – Popular gatherings for motor enthusiasts, every Tuesday afternoon and evening except in winter, close to Kalø Castle Ruin on southern Djursland, 16 km from Ryomgård
 Kattegatcentret – Aquarium by the Sea in Grenaa with large sharks and a focus on Nordic salt water fish. 250 species of marine creatures from around the world, including seals
 Dansk Motor- og Maskinsamling / The Machine Collection with the largest collection of historical stationary engines in Northern Europe going back to 1860. Restored and functioning. 30 km east of Ryomgård 
 Randers Regnskov – Zoo - Rain forest zoo by the river, Gudenaa, in transparent domes representing different continents. 35 km west of Ryomgård
 Aarhus - Denmarks second largest town, with several international attractions, such as, The Old Town, Den gamle By, 60 km from Grenaa  
 Fjord og Kystcentret – visiting centre related to Randers Fjord in Voer 30 km from Ryomgård – focus on activities with regards to fish, fishing and shore biology, exhibits, boat rentals, and guided tours. Mini car ferry across Randers Fjord in Voer
 Herring fishing at Voer in Randers Fjord – seasonal, 27 kilometers from Ryomgård
 Djurslands medieval country churches. Thorsager Church is the only round church in Jutland. Udby church by Randers Fjord is a picturesque navigation mark for incoming ships
 Djurs Sommerland - Amusement park.  The largest attraction on Djursland with regards to number of visitors. 9 km from Ryomgård  
The Agricultural Museum, Landbrugsmuseet, Farmlife through the times.  Extensive historical vegetable gardens and fruit orchards at Gl. Estrup Castle, by the town, Auning, 12 km from Ryomgård
The Manor Museum, Herregårdsmuseet, at Gl. Estrup Castle, by the town, Auning, 12 km from Ryomgård 
 Rosenholm Castle - by Hornslet, plus other castles and manor houses on Djursland
 Golf - Lübker Golf Resort by Nimtofte, also other golfing and golf-resorts such as by Grenaa-, Ebeltoft and Uggelbølle
Munkholm Zoo – Zoo for families with small children. Including friendly animals, and no long walks. 23 km from Ryomgård
 Ree Safari Park – Zoo - In hills including savanna-like landscapes.  Also large animals. 24 km from Ryomgård  
 Skandinavisk Dyrepark – Zoo - Park with extensive Nordic wildlife including brown- and polar bears. 14 km from Ryomgård
 Glasmuseet, Ebeltoft. Modern international glass art and craftsmanship. Also local glass-craft workshops in the Ebeltoft-area. 27 km from Ryomgård 
 , Ebeltoft – One of the world's largest wooden warships, restoration for 15 million euros completed in 1998. 27 km from Ryomgård

See also
 Djursland
 Mols
 Rønde
 Randers
 Århus
 Randers Fjord
 Mols Bjerge National Park
 Grenaa
 Ebeltoft
 Glatved Beach
 Danish steam frigate Jylland
 Katholm Castle
 Kalø Castle  
 Grenaa Beach
 Bønnerup Strand
Cliffs of Sangstrup
 Aarhus (Århus), Ebeltoft and Randers - nearby cities

References

External links
 Ryomgård Byhjemmeside
 Syddjurs Kommune
 Djurslands Jernbanemuseum
 Gjerrildbanestien
 Vallum Sø
 Ryomgaard Realskole
 Ryomgård Hotel
 Marienhoffskolen

Cities and towns in the Central Denmark Region
Syddjurs Municipality